Suisse Secrets was a February 2022 leak of details of more than CHF 100 billion (roughly US$108.5bn, €95.5bn or £80bn) held in nominee accounts linked to over 30,000 clients of Credit Suisse, the largest ever leak from a major Swiss bank.

Background

On 20 February 2022, the Süddeutsche Zeitung reported that "over a year ago" it had received secret data through a secure digital mailbox on more than 30,000 Credit Suisse bank customers and their more than 18,000 accounts, which provide insights into the inner workings of the banking giant. The data was evaluated by 48 media companies from all over the world, among them the Organized Crime and Corruption Reporting Project, The Guardian, The New York Times and Le Monde. Swiss news organisations did not participate in the investigation because a Swiss law concerning bank secrecy forbids the publication of banking secrets. The data covers accounts and transactions from the 1940s up to 2010.

Statement of the source
The data were leaked anonymously by a person or group, who wrote in an accompanying statement, that they felt Swiss banking secrecy laws were "immoral", that "Swiss banks ..[were] collaborators of tax evaders", because "a significant number of these accounts were opened with the sole purpose of hiding their holder's wealth from fiscal institutions and/or avoiding the payment of taxes on capital gains". They opined that Common Reporting Standards were a step in the right direction, but imposed "a disproportionate financial and infrastructural burden on developing nations", which "enables corruption and starves developing countries of much-needed tax revenue". The source stated that "responsibility for this state of affairs does not lie with Swiss banks but rather with the Swiss legal system".

Notable people named

As a result of the leak, numerous people allegedly involved in crimes ranging from corruption and bribery to drug and human trafficking became known as Credit Suisse clients.

King Abdullah II of Jordan and Queen Rania of Jordan
Aliaksei Aleksin, Belarusian businessman blacklisted by the EU and US, close associate of Alexander Lukashenko
Hashim Jawan Bakht, Pakistani politician
Haji Saifullah Khan Bangash, Pakistani politician
Louis Alphonse de Bourbon, Spanish-French aristocrat, and his wife Margarita Vargas
Anas el-Fiqqi, Egypt, former Minister of Information
Ivan Guta, Ukrainian agricultural baron
Abdul Halim Khaddam, Syrian politician
Zahid Ali Akbar Khan, Pakistani general and engineering officer
Waqar Ahmed Khan, Pakistani politician
Sultan Ali Lakhani, Pakistani businessman
Luis Carlos de León, former financial director of La Electricidad de Caracas, a subsidiary of Venezuela's state oil firm PDVSA
Pavlo Lazarenko, former Prime Minister of Ukraine
Ronald Li, founder of the Hong Kong Stock Exchange
Ferdinand Marcos, former President of the Philippines
Imelda Marcos, former First Lady of the Philippines
Hisham Talaat Moustafa, Egyptian real estate magnate
Gamal Mubarak and Alaa Mubarak, sons of former President of Egypt Hosni Mubarak
Sa'ad Khair, Jordanian intelligence chief
Rana Mubashir, Pakistani journalist
Khaled Nezzar, General and former Defense Minister of Algeria
Akhtar Abdur Rahman, former Chairman Joint Chiefs of Staff Committee of Pakistan
Billy Rautenbach, Zimbabwean businessman
Qosim Rohbar, former governor of Sughd and former Minister of Agriculture of Tajikistan
Rodoljub Radulović, Serbian drug lord
Hussein Salem, Egyptian businessman and advisor to Hosni Mubarak
Armen Sarkissian, former President of Armenia 
Eduard Seidel, German businessman
Álvaro Sobrinho, Angolan businessman
James Soong, Taiwanese politician implicated in the Taiwan frigate scandal
Omar Suleiman, former Vice-President of Egypt and former head of the Egyptian General Intelligence Directorate
Nadezhda Tokayeva, former first lady of Kazakhstan
Vasif Talibov, de facto leader of the Azerbaijani exclave of Nakhchivan
Antonio Velardo, money launderer for two families of the Calabrian 'Ndrangheta
Nervis Villalobos, Venezuelan energy minister under Hugo Chavez, part of massive bribery scheme
Bruno Wang, Taiwanese fugitive implicated in the Taiwan frigate scandal

Reactions
On 20 February 2022, Credit Suisse said it "strongly reject[ed]" allegations of wrongdoing. and that 90% of the reviewed accounts were closed or were in the process of closure, so this was largely historical. and that "the accounts of these matters are based on partial, selective information taken out of context, resulting in tendentious interpretations". Credit Suisse alleged it was "a coup against the Swiss banking industry" as a whole without saying who might be behind it.

The Swiss Bankers Association said "The Swiss financial centre has no interest in money of dubious origin. It attaches the greatest importance to the maintenance of its reputation and integrity."

The Swiss Financial Market Supervisory Authority said it was in contact with Credit Suisse. 

In February 2022, the European People's Party of the European Parliament proposed reviewing Swiss banking practices and money laundering status in response to the leaks, asking the European Commission to reclassify Switzerland as a high-risk country for financial crime. Liam Proud wrote in Reuters, "stability and unimpeachable competence [...] seem to be lacking at Credit Suisse".

Since leaking financial data is a criminal offense in Switzerland (even if it is in the public interest) punishable with up to five years in jail, Swiss media argued in February 2022 that the banking secrecy law runs contrary to freedom of speech and freedom of the press in some cases.

Context
Credit Suisse has long provided loans to fund billionaires’ private jet purchases. In 2014, it started funding jet purchases as well. In 2021, it granted $2 billion in loans to its "ultra-high-net-worth" clients, namely tycoons and oligarchs. Increasingly US sanctions were enacted against Russian oligarchs, and in 2017 and 2018, 12 clients defaulted. In May 2018, it was reported that Oleg Deripaska had to return three private jets owned by Credit Suisse and Raiffeisen. In 2019 it was reported that the $25 million and $15 million jets owned respectively by Arkady Rotenberg and Boris Romanovich Rotenberg were placed on sale by Credit Suisse. 

In 2021, Credit Suisse made a risk transfer by opening up this risk of default to hedge funds. It offered the clients assets of "jets, yachts, real estate and/or financial assets" as security, paying a 11 % interest rate.

On 2 March 2022, it became known that Credit Suisse had asked its investors to destroy documents linked to the securisation of yacht loans of oligarchs.

See also
Banking in Switzerland
Offshore Leaks, 2013
Panama Papers, 2016
Bahamas Leaks, 2016
Pandora Papers, 2021
Paradise Papers, 2017
Swiss Leaks, 2015 involving HSBC
LuxLeaks, 2014
Football Leaks, 2016

References

External links
  of the Organized Crime and Corruption Reporting Project

2022 scandals
Data journalism
Investigative journalism
2022 documents
Data breaches
Credit Suisse